FNH may refer to:

 Farnham railway station in England
 Felt, Not Heard, an American audio studio
 Ferrocarril Nacional de Honduras, the national rail operator in Honduras
 Fincha Airport, in Ethiopia
 FN Herstal, a Belgian firearms manufacturer
 Focal nodular hyperplasia
 Fools and Heroes, a British live-action role playing system
 Sidus FNH, a Korean movie production company